In mathematics, especially functional analysis, a normal operator on a complex Hilbert space H is a continuous linear operator N : H → H that commutes with its hermitian adjoint N*, that is: NN* = N*N.

Normal operators are important because the spectral theorem holds for them. The class of normal operators is well understood. Examples of normal operators are
 unitary operators: N* = N−1
 Hermitian operators (i.e., self-adjoint operators): N* = N
 Skew-Hermitian operators: N* = −N
 positive operators: N = MM* for some M (so N is self-adjoint).

A normal matrix is the matrix expression of a normal operator on the Hilbert space Cn.

Properties

Normal operators are characterized by the spectral theorem. A compact normal operator (in particular, a normal operator on a finite-dimensional linear space) is unitarily diagonalizable.

Let  be a bounded operator. The following are equivalent.
  is normal.
  is normal.
  for all  (use ).
 The self-adjoint and anti–self adjoint parts of  commute.

If  is a normal operator, then  and  have the same kernel and the same range. Put in another way, the kernel of a normal operator is the orthogonal complement of its range. This implies the usual spectral theorem: every normal operator on a finite-dimensional space is diagonalizable by a unitary operator. There is also an infinite-dimensional version of the spectral theorem expressed in terms of projection-valued measures. The residual spectrum of a normal operator is empty.

The product of normal operators that commute is again normal; this is nontrivial, but follows directly from Fuglede's theorem, which states (in a form generalized by Putnam):

The operator norm of a normal operator equals its numerical radius and spectral radius.

A normal operator coincides with its Aluthge transform.

Properties in finite-dimensional case

If a normal operator T on a finite-dimensional real or complex Hilbert space (inner product space) H stabilizes a subspace V, then it also stabilizes its orthogonal complement V⊥. (This statement is trivial in the case where T is self-adjoint.)

Proof. Let PV be the orthogonal projection onto V. Then the orthogonal projection onto V⊥ is 1H−PV. The fact that T stabilizes V can be expressed as (1H−PV)TPV = 0, or TPV = PVTPV. The goal is to show that PVT(1H−PV) = 0.

Let X = PVT(1H−PV). Since (A, B) ↦ tr(AB*) is an inner product on the space of endomorphisms of H, it is enough to show that tr(XX*) = 0. First we note that

Now using properties of the trace and of orthogonal projections we have:

The same argument goes through for compact normal operators in infinite dimensional Hilbert spaces, where one make use of the Hilbert-Schmidt inner product, defined by tr(AB*) suitably interpreted. However, for bounded normal operators, the orthogonal complement to a stable subspace may not be stable. It follows that the Hilbert space cannot in general be spanned by eigenvectors of a normal operator.

The invariant subspaces of a shift acting on Hardy space are characterized by Beurling's theorem.

Normal elements of algebras

The notion of normal operators generalizes to an involutive algebra:

An element x of an involutive algebra is said to be normal if xx* = x*x.

Self-adjoint and unitary elements are normal.

The most important case is when such an algebra is a C*-algebra.

Unbounded normal operators

The definition of normal operators naturally generalizes to some class of unbounded operators. Explicitly, a closed operator N is said to be normal if 

Here, the existence of the adjoint N* requires that the domain of N be dense, and the equality includes the assertion that the domain of N*N equals that of NN*, which is not necessarily the case in general.

Equivalently normal operators are precisely those for which
 
with

The spectral theorem still holds for unbounded (normal) operators. The proofs work by reduction to bounded (normal) operators.

Generalization

The success of the theory of normal operators led to several attempts for generalization by weakening the commutativity requirement. Classes of operators that include normal operators are (in order of inclusion)
 Hyponormal operators
 Normaloids
 Paranormal operators
 Quasinormal operators
 Subnormal operators

See also

Notes

References

Linear operators
Operator theory